Borys is a name of Bulgarian origin, equivalent to the Bulgarian-derived spelling Boris.

It may refer to:
Borys Baranets (born 1986), professional Ukrainian football midfielder who plays for FC Lviv in the Ukrainian Premier League
Borys Buryak (born 1953), Ukrainian painter
Borys Chambul (born 1953), retired discus thrower, who represented Canada at the 1976 Summer Olympics
Borys Derkach (born 1964), retired Soviet and Ukrainian professional football player
Borys Hrinchenko (1863–1910), classical Ukrainian prose writer, political activist, historian, publicist, ethnographer
Borys Kolesnykov (born 1962), Ukrainian politician and 50th richest man in Ukraine
Borys Lankosz (born 1973), Polish film director
Borys Lyatoshynsky (1895–1968), Ukrainian composer, conductor and teacher
Borys Miturski (born 1989), Polish speedway rider who was a member of Poland U-21 national team
Borys Mykolaiovych Martos (1879–1977), public and political activist, pedagogue, economist
Borys Orlovskyi (born 1993), Ukrainian football midfielder
Borys Paton (born 1918), the long-term chairman of the National Academy of Sciences of Ukraine
Borys Szyc (born 1978), Polish theatre and movie actor
Borys Tarasyuk (born 1949), Ukrainian politician
Borys Taschy (born 1993), professional Ukrainian football midfielder
Borys Tereshchuk (born 1945), Ukrainian former volleyball player who competed for the Soviet Union in the 1968 Summer Olympics
Borys Wrzesnewskyj (born 1960), Canadian politician who represents the riding of Etobicoke Centre in the Canadian House of Commons

See also 
Andżelika Borys (born 1973), Polish activist in Belarus
Karol Borys (born 2006), Polish footballer
Bloc Borys Olijnyk and Myhailo Syrota, electoral alliance in Ukraine created in December 2005
Borys Grinchenko Kyiv University, higher education institution of 4th accreditation level
Stan Borys (born 1941), Polish singer-songwriter, actor, director and poet

Ukrainian masculine given names

it:Borys